The 1949 Stanley Cup Finals was a best-of-seven series between the Detroit Red Wings and the defending champion Toronto Maple Leafs, the second straight Finals series between Detroit and Toronto. The Maple Leafs won the series in four straight games to win their third consecutive Stanley Cup and eighth in the history of the franchise.

Paths to the Finals
Detroit defeated the Montreal Canadiens 4–2 to advance to the Finals. Toronto defeated the Boston Bruins 4–1 to advance to the Finals.

Game summaries
The Maple Leafs became the first NHL team to win the Stanley Cup in three straight seasons. By defeating Detroit, Toronto won the Stanley Cup with a losing regular-season record. The only other team to win the Stanley Cup after finishing the regular season with a losing record was the Chicago Black Hawks, who qualified for the 1938 playoffs with a losing record and ultimately beat Toronto in the Cup Finals three games to one.

Stanley Cup engraving
The 1949 Stanley Cup was presented to Maple Leafs captain Ted Kennedy by NHL President Clarence Campbell following the Maple Leafs 3–1 win over the Red Wings in game four.

The following Maple Leafs players and staff had their names engraved on the Stanley Cup

1948–49 Toronto Maple Leafs

See also
 1948–49 NHL season

References and notes

 Podnieks, Andrew; Hockey Hall of Fame (2004). Lord Stanley's Cup. Bolton, Ont.: Fenn Pub. pp 12, 50. 

Stanley Cup
Stanley Cup Finals
Detroit Red Wings games
Toronto Maple Leafs games
Ice hockey competitions in Detroit
Ice hockey competitions in Toronto
April 1949 sports events in Canada 
April 1949 sports events in the United States 
1949 in Detroit
Stanley Cup
1949 in Ontario
1940s in Toronto